Ba Dai (June 1930 – 26 March 2022) was a Chinese politician of Mongolian ethnicity who served as chairman of the Xinjiang Regional Committee of the Chinese People's Political Consultative Conference between 1988 and 1993.

He was a representative of the 13th National Congress of the Chinese Communist Party and 14th National Congress of the Chinese Communist Party. He was a delegate to the 3rd, 4th, 5th and 6th National People's Congress. He was a member of the 7th and 9th National Committee of the Chinese People's Political Consultative Conference and a member of the 8th Standing Committee of the Chinese People's Political Consultative Conference.

Biography
Ba Dai was born in Hejing County, Xinjiang, in 1930, during the Republic of China. He joined the Chinese Communist Party in on 1 July 1953. He worked as head of Organization Department of CPC Bayingolin Mongol Autonomous Prefecture Committee before being appointed as governor of Bayingolin Mongol Autonomous Prefecture in 1963.

After the Cultural Revolution, in 1977, he was promoted to become vice chairman of Xinjiang Uygur Autonomous Region. He served as vice chairperson of the National People's Congress Ethnic Affairs Committee from 1983 to 1988. He was appointed secretary of Xinjiang Regional Political and Legal Affairs Commission in 1984 and admitted to member of the standing committee of the CPC Xinjiang Regional Committee, the region's top authority. He was chairman of the Xinjiang Regional Committee of the Chinese People's Political Consultative Conference in 1988, and held that office until 1993.

References

1930 births
2022 deaths
People from Hejing County
People's Republic of China politicians from Xinjiang
Chinese Communist Party politicians from Xinjiang
Members of the 7th Chinese People's Political Consultative Conference
Members of the Standing Committee of the 8th Chinese People's Political Consultative Conference
Members of the 9th Chinese People's Political Consultative Conference
Governors of Bayingolin Mongol Autonomous Prefecture
Delegates to the 3rd National People's Congress
Delegates to the 4th National People's Congress
Delegates to the 5th National People's Congress
Delegates to the 6th National People's Congress